In molecular biology, Small nucleolar RNA snoR86 (also known as snoR86) is a non-coding RNA (ncRNA) which modifies other small nuclear RNAs (snRNAs). It is a member of the H/ACA class of small nucleolar RNA that guide the sites of modification of uridines to pseudouridines. Plant snoR86 was identified in a screen of Arabidopsis thaliana.

References

External links 
 

Small nuclear RNA